Palor (Falor, Paloor) is a language spoken in Senegal. The speakers of this language - the Palor people or Serer-Palor, are ethnically Serers but they do not speak the Serer-Sine language. Like the Lehar, Saafi, Noon and Ndut languages, their language is classified as one of the Cangin languages attached to the Niger–Congo family. Palor is closer to Ndut.

Other names
Sili or Sili-Sili (the name for their language) and Waro (the name for themselves).

References

Bibliography
 Walter Pichl, The Cangin Group - A Language Group in Northern Senegal, Pittsburg, Pennsylvanie, Institute of African Affairs, Duquesne University, Coll. African Reprint Series, 1966, vol. 20
 Paula D’Alton, Le Palor. Esquisse phonologique et grammatical d’une langue cangin du Sénégal, Paris, 1987

External links
  "L'évolution du système consonantique des langues cangin"

Languages of Senegal
Cangin languages